Iran–Sweden relations are foreign relations between the Islamic Republic of Iran and the Kingdom of Sweden.

History

In 1911, the Swedish government was asked by the Persians if soldiers could be sent to Qajar Persia to organize the construction of a gendarmerie. In the same year, the first Swedish officers came to the country. This became the Iranian Gendarmerie, commanded by Swedish officers between 1911 and 1921. The first Swedish officers traveled to Persia in 1911, and during the period 1911-1915, a total of about sixty Swedes worked in the country. The police force was equipped by the Swedish police. When World War I broke out, the Swedes were accused of cooperating with Germany, which resulted in the officers and police having to leave Persia.

Sweden and Pahlavi Iran established diplomatic relations in connection with the conclusion of a treaty of friendship in 1929. Iran operates an embassy in Stockholm and Sweden operates an embassy in Tehran.

In November 1934, Swedish Crown Prince Gustaf Adolf, Crown Princess Margaret, Princess Ingrid and Prince Bertil visited Iran. At the border, they were received by a representative of the Persian government and in Tehran by the Foreign Minister and the Grand Master of the Ceremonies, as well as representatives of the government agencies. The Crown Prince's family went in a procession to the castle, where the Shah and the Crown Prince represented the council president and others. Reza Shah then accompanied the Crown Prince to the Golestan Palace. After several days in the Persian capital, the Crown Prince left for the Mazandaran Province to study for three days the ongoing construction work on the Trans-Iranian Railway. He then returned to Tehran to say goodbye to the Shah. The Crown Prince's family then left on 17 November in Volvo cars for Isfahan and Persepolis. In the latter place, the royals lived in the so-called Xerxes' harem and visited the city under the leadership of Professor Ernst Herzfeld. An excursion was made to Shiraz. On 25 November, the return journey to Baghdad began over the snowy passes along the Kum-Sultanabad-Kermanshah road.

Government level 

In February 2017, Swedish prime minister Stefan Löfven and minister of trade Ann Linde, along with representatives from government agencies and companies, visited Iran and met with several Iranian ministers. Linde was criticized for wearing the Islamic veil during the trip.

Academic partnerships 
In the late 2010s and into 2020, a number of Swedish academic universities and institutions pursued partnerships and exchange programs with institutions in Iran, also after Swedish-Iranian researcher Ahmad Reza Jalali was given the death penalty by Iranian authorities in October 2017. These academic institutions were:

 Lund University
 Chalmers University of Technology
 Linnaeus University
 Malmö University
 KTH Royal Institute of Technology
 University of Borås
 Halmstad University
 University of Gothenburg
 Mälardalen University College
 Luleå University of Technology
 Jönköping University
 Gävle University College
 University of Skövde

Nuclear program

The Chairman of the Swedish parliament's Foreign Policy Commission said in 2008 that Iran has a right to civilian nuclear technology. He also supported diplomatic means to find a solution to the issue that acceptable to both sides. In 2007, Christofer Gyllenstierna, the Swedish Ambassador to Iran, claimed that because traders and businessmen ultimately make investment decisions in Sweden, economic sanctions would not affect Sweden's trade with Iran. In February 2009, Greece, Cyprus, Spain, Austria and Sweden opposed a list of additional stricter sanctions proposed by the EU3 against the Islamic Republic.

In July 2009, the Swedish Foreign Minister Carl Bildt insisted that dialogue was the only solution to the Iranian nuclear situation, saying that the European Parliament faced difficult choices when world powers restarted talks with Tehran to halt Iranian uranium enrichment in exchange for political and economic incentives.

Economic relationship
Christofer Gyllenstierna, Sweden's Ambassador to Iran, said at a symposium in Tehran in 2007 that Sweden has potential markets in Iran. He also said that Iran's capabilities and possibilities have attracted the attention of Swedish businesses. He claimed that Sweden planned on increasing mutual trade cooperation with Iran. In 2003, Sweden and Iran signed a Memorandum of Understanding (MoU), in which Sweden recommended that Iran be given membership in the World Trade Organization (WTO). In return, Iran would allow Sweden to implement industrial, mining, and telecommunication projects inside the country. Since the UN Security Council and the European Union (which Sweden is part of) began imposing stricter sanctions, however, Swedish–Iranian bilateral trade has declined. Bilateral trade between the two amounted to only $500 million in 2007. However, Swedish companies such as Stockholm Chartering AB have been reported to have found innovative means to skirt EU sanctions on Iran. Relations between Sweden and IRI have been shaky because of the arrest of Hamid Noury.

Sports
On 31 March 2015, the first friendly football match was played between the Swedish national team and the Iranian national team at the Friends Arena.

See also
 Foreign relations of Iran
 Foreign relations of Sweden 
 Iran–European Union relations 
 Swedish Iranians
 Trial of Hamid Nouri
 Ahmad Reza Djalali

References

External links

 Sweden - Encyclopædia Iranica

 
Sweden
Bilateral relations of Sweden